Fagus japonica, known as the Japanese beech, Japanese blue beech or in Japanese as inubuna ("dog buna") or kurobuna ("black buna"), is a deciduous tree of the beech family Fagaceae.

Distribution
It is endemic to Japan, where it is one of the main tree species in natural deciduous forests particularly on the Pacific side of the country.

Description
It reaches 25 metres in height. The growth habit is often multi-trunked. Bark is smooth and grey. The simple leaves are arranged alternately along the branch. They are slightly pubescent and slightly glaucous beneath, with 10–14 pairs of lateral nerves. Fruiting peduncles are 3–4 cm long and glabrous.

References

japonica
Trees of Japan
Endemic flora of Japan